Spalding Township may refer to:

 Spalding Township, Menominee County, Michigan
 Spalding Township, Aitkin County, Minnesota

See also

Spalding (disambiguation)

Township name disambiguation pages